ISO 3166-2:US is the entry for the United States in ISO 3166-2, part of the ISO 3166 standard published by the International Organization for Standardization (ISO), which defines codes for the names of the principal subdivisions (e.g., provinces or states) of all countries coded in ISO 3166-1.

Currently for the United States, ISO 3166-2 codes are defined for the following subdivisions:

 50 states
 1 district (i.e., the District of Columbia, the capital of the country, also known as Washington DC)
 6 outlying areas (including the United States Minor Outlying Islands, a collection of nine islands or groups of islands)

Each code consists of two parts, separated by a hyphen. The second part is two letters, which is the postal abbreviation of the state, district, or outlying area, except the United States Minor Outlying Islands which do not have a postal abbreviation.

Current codes
Subdivision names are listed as in the ISO 3166-2 standard published by the ISO 3166 Maintenance Agency (ISO 3166/MA).

Click on the button in the header to sort each column.

Subdivisions included in ISO 3166-1
Besides being included as subdivisions of the United States in ISO 3166-2, the outlying areas are also officially assigned their own country codes in ISO 3166-1.

See also
 FIPS region codes of United States
 FIPS state codes of the United States
 Political divisions of the United States

External links
 ISO Online Browsing Platform: US
 States of the United States, Statoids.com

2:US
Lists of subdivisions of the United States
Lists of United States abbreviations